Faridpur-1 is a constituency represented in the Jatiya Sangsad (National Parliament) of Bangladesh since 2019 by Monzur Hossain of the Awami League.

Boundaries 
The constituency encompasses Alfadanga, Boalmari, and Madhukhali upazilas.

History 
The constituency was created for the first general elections in newly independent Bangladesh, held in 1973.

Members of Parliament

Elections

Elections in the 2010s 
Abdur Rahman was re-elected unopposed in the 2014 general election after opposition parties withdrew their candidacies in a boycott of the election.

Elections in the 2000s 

In 2005, Kazi Sirajul Islam joined the BNP. This led to the Election Commission declaring his seat vacant on 4 June 2005 under Article 70 of the Constitution, which penalizes floor-crossing. Shah Mohammad Abu Zafar of the BNP was elected in an August 2005 by-election.

Elections in the 1990s

References

External links
 

Parliamentary constituencies in Bangladesh
Faridpur District